David Bratman is a librarian and Tolkien scholar.

Biography 

David Bratman was born in Chicago to Robert Bratman, a physician, and his wife Nancy, an editor. He was one of four sons in the family. He was brought up in Cleveland, Ohio and then in California. He was educated at the University of California-Berkeley, and took his M.L.S. at the University of Washington. He works as a librarian at university and other libraries. He has contributed to Tolkien scholarship since 1977, including 13 entries for the J. R. R. Tolkien Encyclopedia, and a chapter in Wiley-Blackwell's A Companion to J. R. R. Tolkien. He has helped to run the Hugo Awards for science fiction and fantasy. 

Bratman has edited the journal Mythprint for the Mythopoeic Society; he edits and contributes to the journal Tolkien Studies and to Mythlore, a journal on the Inklings. He contributes articles on music to San Francisco Classical Voice.

References

External links 

 
 
 

Tolkien studies